Mittelems is an electoral constituency (German: Wahlkreis) represented in the Bundestag. It elects one member via first-past-the-post voting. Under the current constituency numbering system, it is designated as constituency 31. It is located in western Lower Saxony, comprising the Grafschaft Bentheim district and the southern part of the Emsland district.

Mittelems was created for the 1980 federal election. Since 2013, it has been represented by Albert Stegemann of the Christian Democratic Union (CDU).

Geography
Mittelems is located in western Lower Saxony. As of the 2021 federal election, it comprises the entirety of the Grafschaft Bentheim district and the southern part of the Emsland district, specifically the municipalities of Emsbüren, Geeste, Haselünne, Lingen, Meppen, and Salzbergen, as well as the Samtgemeinden of Freren, Herzlake, Lengerich, and Spelle.

History
Mittelems was created in 1980 and contained parts of the abolished constituencies of Emsland and Lingen. Until the 2002 election, it was constituency number 26. From then until 2013, it was constituency 32. Since 2013, it has been constituency 31. Its borders have not changed since its creation.

Members
The constituency has been held continuously by the Christian Democratic Union (CDU) since its creation. Its first representative was Burkhard Ritz, who served a single term. He was succeeded by Hans-Gerd Strube, who served until 1994, followed by Hermann Kues. In 2013, Albert Stegemann was elected representative. He was re-elected in 2017 and 2021.

Election results

2021 election

2017 election

2013 election

2009 election

Notes

References

Federal electoral districts in Lower Saxony
1980 establishments in West Germany
Constituencies established in 1980